Horsh Ehden is a Nature Reserve located in North Lebanon. It contains a diverse forest of the cedar of Lebanon, making it a part of the country's cultural and natural heritage. Located on the northwestern slopes of Mount Lebanon with high precipitation, it hosts numerous rare and endemic plants. Stands of cedars also include a mixed forest of juniper, fir, and the country's last protected community of wild apple trees. In the forest are endangered eastern imperial eagles or Bonelli's eagles, gray wolves, wildcats, Golden Jackals, and Red Foxes. Valleys and gorges also have wild orchids, salamanders, mushrooms, and other flora and fauna.

Natural history

Biodiversity
Over 1,058 plant species have been identified in the reserve, accounting for nearly 40% of all native plant species in Lebanon, though the reserve represents less than 0.1% of the total area of Lebanon. The forests form a unique assemblage of conifers, deciduous, and evergreen broadleaf trees in an isolated climatic phytochorion with a highly varied topography.

Flora
1,020 species of native plants and 39 species of native trees have been identified. Seventy species use "Lebanon" in their names, such as Cedrus libani, Salix libanii, and Berberis libanoticum. Twenty-two other species carry names significant to Lebanon, such as Dianthus karami (after Youssef Bey Karam, a 19th-century national figure), and Astragalus ehdenensis (after the village of Ehden). A total of 212 (20%) species are rare and another 126 (12%) are considered threatened; 115 are endemic to Lebanon, and ten are endemic to Horsh Ehden. Seventy-eight species are recognized as medicinal plants. The reserve is also considered the southernmost limit to Ciliciam fir (Abies cilicica).

Plant communities
The forest plant communities of highest conservation importance are:
Lebanon cedar (Cedrus libani var. libanii), which represents about 20% of the remaining cedar forests in Lebanon,
Ciliciam fir (Abies cilicica),
Greek juniper (Juniperus excelsa), which is a gene pool for possible reforestation projects at higher altitude including the peaks of Mount Lebanon above 2000 m, and
Lebanese wild apple (Malus trilobata).
Horsh Ehden is the only protected area in Lebanon containing the last remaining forest community of the endemic wild apple of Lebanon.

Fauna

Mammals
More than 27 species of mammals (not including bats) have been sighted in the reserve, representing a third of Lebanese mammals. Insectivores, carnivores, rodents, lagomorpha, chiroptera, and artiodactyls have all been identified in the reserve.

Thirteen species are globally threatened, one species is locally threatened and highly endangered (the gray wolf, Canis lupus), and one species is endemic to the reserve (the lesser white-toothed shrew, Crocidura suaveolens).

Species identified in the reserve include Cape hare (Lepus capensis), wood mouse (Apodemus sylvaticus), Eurasian badger (Meles meles), southern white-breasted hedgehog (Erinaceus concolor),  Indian porcupine (Histrix indica), Caucasian squirrel (Sciurus anomalus), striped hyena (Hyaena hyanena), least weasel (Mustela nivalis), wildcat (Felis silvestris), gray wolf (Canis lupus), and marbled polecat (Vormela Peregusna).

The reserve may have also been home to extinct species in Lebanon such as roe deer (Capreolus capreolus), Persian fallow deer (Dama dama mesopotamica), Anatolian leopard (Panthera pardus tulliana), Syrian brown bear (Ursus arctos syriacus), and aurochs (Bos primigenius).

Birds
The reserve has many different bird habitats. Four of the identified bird species are globally threatened, five are regionally vulnerable, eighteen face unfavorable conditions in Europe, and fifty-seven are rare in Lebanon.

Species include eastern imperial eagle (Aquila heliaca), Bonelli's eagle  (Hieraaetus fasciatus), blue tit (Parus caeruleus), corn crake (Crex crex), Levant sparrowhawk (Accipiter brevipes), saker falcon (Falco cherrug), white pelican (Pelecanus onocratalus), black stork (Ciconia nigra), Egyptian vulture (Neophron perenopetrus), European bee-eater (Merops apiaster), sand martin (Riparia riparia), white stork (Ciconia ciconia), common wood-pigeon (Columba polumbus), great spotted cuckoo (Clamator glandarius), barn owl (Tyto alba), and the Syrian woodpecker (Dendrocopos syriacus).

Amphibians and reptiles
There are four species of amphibians and nineteen species of reptiles. One species (Mediterranean chameleon, Chamaeleo chamaeleon) is globally threatened, one subspecies is unique, and nineteen species are threatened in Lebanon.

Species include Lebanon viper (Montivipera bornmuelleri), Palestinian viper (Vipera palaestinae), green whip snake (Hierophis viridiflavus), bridled mabuya (Trachylepis vittata), Schreiber's fringe-fingered lizard (Acanthodactylus schreiberi), desert black snake (Walterinnesia aegyptia), common toad (Bufo bufo).

Cultural heritage and Activities [consider deleting this section as promotional]
When to visit: Autumn and spring are the most temperate seasons for hiking. October is the best month for autumnal colors, and April to May are the best months to see the reserve in bloom.
Recreational activities: Bird watching, hiking, mountain biking and photography are possible throughout the year. The reserve has a camp offering outdoor educational activities for children during the week and for adults on the weekend. Activities depend on the season and vary from year-to-year.
 Archaeological sites: There are no archaeological sites inside the reserve. However, the village of Ehden has historical churches and monasteries, as well as the old souk (market place) in the historic area.  The Church of St. Mamas (Mar Memas) is the first Maronite church constructed with stones in Lebanon.
 Other nearby activities: Nearby villages include Ehden. The Cathedral of the Lady of the Citadel (Saydet Al-Hosn), a modern church in the shape of a star and located on a summit, offers a panoramic view of north Lebanon. Al-Midan, Ehden's historic souk characterized by traditional Lebanese architecture has cafés, patisseries and restaurants.

See also

 Al Shouf Cedar Nature Reserve
 Aammiq Wetland
 Palm Islands Nature Reserve

References

External links
 Horsh Ehden official website
 Location on Wikimapia
 Ehden Family Tree

Nature reserves in Lebanon
Forests of Lebanon
Tourist attractions in Lebanon
Zgharta District
Tourism in Lebanon